Cyrus Shakhalaga Khwa Jirongo, popularly Cyrus Jirongo, is a politician and a former Member of Parliament in Kenya.
Between 1978 and 1981 he went to Mang'u High School. He became the chairman of AFC Leopards football club in 1991.

He is leader of the United Democratic Party.

Political career

YK 92
In 1992 he led the Youth for Kanu '92 (YK '92) movement supporting the then ruling KANU party ahead of the first multiparty elections in Kenya.

1997-2001 Parliamentary Career
He became an MP at the 1997 elections, when he won the Lugari Constituency seat. Two years later he fell out with KANU and was associated with the unregistered United Democratic Movement party. Nevertheless, ahead of the 2002 elections, he was appointed the Rural Development Minister. At the elections he represented KANU but was defeated by Enoch Kibunguchy of NARC.

2007-2012 Parliamentary Return
He formed a new political party known as Kenya African Democratic Development Union (KADDU) and successfully reclaimed the Lugari Constituency seat at the 2007 elections. The elections were followed by political crisis in Kenya which was resolved by a broad coalition government. KADDU is the only parliamentary party not taking part in the government and Jirongo is the sole MP for the party. In his bid to become Kenya's fourth president, he had been identified with the  URP and  more recently New FORD-Kenya, before formally joining the Federal Party of Kenya

2013 Presidential Run
Jirongo declared an interest in running for the Kenya Presidential seat in the 2013 Kenyan Presidential election. He eventually opted to run for the Kakamega County Senate seat and support the right Hon. Raila Odinga's bid for the presidency. He lost the bid to Dr. Bonny Khalwale.

2017 general elections
In the 2017 Kenyan general elections Jirongo vied for the presidency under the United Democratic Party. He garnered approximately 11,000 votes which were 0.07% of the total votes in the elections.

2022 general elections 
The United Democratic Party contested the 2022 Kenyan general election as part of Azimio La Umoja, and elected two MPs. Jirongo congratulated William Ruto on his victory.

Personal life
He is polygamous and has four active wives, the first one is a Kalenjin, Joan Chemutai Kimeto (Divorced), second is an Agikuyu, Christine Nyokabi Kimani, third is a Kamba, Anne Kanini and the fourth is a Maasai, Anne Lanoi Pertet.

References 

Year of birth missing (living people)
Living people
Kenya African National Union politicians
United Democratic Movement (Kenya) politicians
Government ministers of Kenya
Kenyan Luhya people
Alumni of Mang'u High School
Candidates for President of Kenya
Leaders of political parties in Kenya